Random—Burin—St. George's was a federal electoral district in Newfoundland and Labrador, Canada, that was represented in the House of Commons of Canada from 2004 to 2015.

Demographics
Ethnic groups: 94.7% White, 4.8% Native Canadian 
Languages: 98.5% English 
Religions: 54.6% Protestant, 43.8% Catholic, 1.3% No affiliation 
Average income: $19 018

Geography
The district included the south coast of the island of Newfoundland, the Stephenville area, the Burin Peninsula, and the west-central coast of Trinity Bay including Random Island, Brunette Island, Long Island, Merasheen Island, Red Island and the Ramea Islands.

The neighbouring ridings were Avalon, Bonavista—Gander—Grand Falls—Windsor, and Humber—St. Barbe—Baie Verte.

According to Elections Canada, the boundaries of this riding for the 39th General Election were:

 "All that area consisting of that part of the Island of Newfoundland lying southerly and westerly of a line described as follows: commencing at Bluff Head on the eastern shoreline of Port au Port Bay; thence easterly in a straight line to Georges Lake; thence easterly in a straight line to the mouth of Lloyds River at the westernmost extremity of Red Indian Lake; thence southerly in a straight line to a point in Victoria Lake at latitude 48°15'N and approximate longitude 57°21'W; thence generally easterly to the intersection of the Trans-Canada Highway (Route No. 1) with Route No. 230; thence easterly along Route No. 230 to Route No. 230A; thence easterly in a straight line to Ocean Pond; thence southeasterly in a straight line to British Harbour at the entrance of Smith Sound on the north shoreline of Trinity Bay; thence southeasterly to said bay; thence southerly along Trinity Bay to the easterly production in Trinity Bay of the northerly limit of the Town of Sunnyside; thence westerly along said production and said northerly limit to the Trans-Canada Highway (Route No. 1); thence southerly along said highway to the northerly limit of the Town of Come By Chance; thence westerly and southerly along the northerly and westerly limits of said town to the shoreline of Placentia Bay; thence southerly along the Eastern Channel of Placentia Bay and Placentia Bay to a point approximately 20 km west of Cape St. Mary's. Including Random Island, Ireland's Eye, Merasheen Island, Red Island, Long Island, Green Island, Brunette Island, Penguin Islands, Ramea Islands and all other islands adjacent to the shoreline of the above-described area."

History
The electoral district was created in 2003: 87.1% of the population of the riding came from Burin—St. George's, 12.9% from Bonavista—Trinity—Conception, and 0.1% from Humber—St. Barbe—Baie Verte. The incumbent for Burin—St. George's riding was Bill Matthews of the Liberal Party of Canada. Following the 2012 federal electoral redistribution, this riding was dissolved and divided between Bonavista—Burin—Trinity (45%), Long Range Mountains (44%) and Coast of Bays—Central—Notre Dame (11%), with the new boundaries taking effect at the 2015 federal election.

This riding elected the following Members of Parliament:

Election results

Random—Burin—St. George's, 2003 Representation Order

See also
 List of Canadian federal electoral districts
 Past Canadian electoral districts

References

Notes

External links
 Random—Burin—St. George's riding from Elections Canada
 Riding history for Random—Burin—St. George's (2003– ) from the Library of Parliament
 Election Financial Reports from Elections Canada

Former federal electoral districts of Newfoundland and Labrador
Stephenville, Newfoundland and Labrador